Chrotogonus senegalensis is a species of grasshopper in the family Pyrgomorphidae. It is found in the Sahel of Africa and in Central Africa.

It is also found in the Dogon Country of Mali, where the Dogon people refer to it as a "small toad grasshopper".

References

External links
 Names in Dogon languages, with images from Mali

Acrididae
Insects described in 1877
Orthoptera of Africa